Loch Etchachan is a remote freshwater loch set deep within the central Cairngorms plateau, in the Cairngorms National Park, located in the eastern Highlands of Scotland.

Geography
Directly north of the loch and lying  lower lies Loch A'an and the imposing peak of Cairn Gorm. To the northeast lies Beinn Mheadhoin, known for its broad and flat summit. To west, rising vertically lies the plateau of Carn Etchachan which constitute the lower slopes of Ben Macdui rising to a peak south of the loch,  the second highest mountain in the UK.  To the east, the loch flows into Little Loch Etchahan, which outflows through the gap made up of  Creagan a' Choire Etchachan in the south and Stobb Coire Etchachan in the north, into what will become the Derry Burn turning southwards becoming the Lui Water before eventually flowing into the River Dee

Trivia
On 12 August 2009, members of the Inverness Rowing Club carried a boat all the way up to the loch from the Linn of Dee, and rowed on the loch. This is believed to be the first time the loch has been rowed upon. Similarly, on Saturday 25 June 2011, members of Dundee Mountain Club carried a 3m long windsurf board plus, mast, and two sails to the loch to be the first to windsurf upon it. They also carried an ironing board and iron to do extreme ironing there at the same time. Both of these feats involved carrying the equipment on an 18.5 mile (30 km) round trip including 2,500 ft (750m) of ascent.

References

Lochs of Aberdeenshire
Freshwater lochs of Scotland
Cairngorms